Kim Moon-soo (born 29 December 1963) is a former badminton player from South Korea.

Career
He has won 2 titles in the World Badminton Championships in men's doubles. He also won a gold medal at the Summer Olympics and 3 All England Open Badminton Championships in men's doubles. All of these were gained with fellow countryman Park Joo-bong, his regular partner during most his badminton career.  In 1988, Kim married fellow 1985 World Champion Yoo Sang Hee after Yoo retired from international badminton.  Kim himself retired in 1993, after contributing to Korea's Sudirman Cup victory. Kim competed for Korea in badminton at the 1992 Summer Olympics in men's doubles with partner Park Joo-bong. They won the gold medal defeating Eddy Hartono and Rudy Gunawan from Indonesia 15–11, 15–7. Kim was inducted into the Badminton Hall of Fame in 2002

Achievements

Olympic Games 
Men's doubles

World Championships 
Men's doubles

World Cup 
Men's doubles
Mixed doubles

Asian Games 
Men's doubles

Asian Championships 
Men's doubles

IBF World Grand Prix 
The World Badminton Grand Prix sanctioned by International Badminton Federation (IBF) from 1983 to 2006.

Men's doubles

References

External links
 
 
 

South Korean male badminton players
Badminton players at the 1992 Summer Olympics
Badminton players at the 1996 Summer Olympics
Olympic badminton players of South Korea
Olympic gold medalists for South Korea
Olympic medalists in badminton
Asian Games medalists in badminton
1963 births
Living people
Badminton players at the 1986 Asian Games
World No. 1 badminton players
Badminton players at the 1990 Asian Games
Medalists at the 1992 Summer Olympics
Asian Games gold medalists for South Korea
Asian Games silver medalists for South Korea
Asian Games bronze medalists for South Korea
Medalists at the 1986 Asian Games
Medalists at the 1990 Asian Games